Dan Ndoye (born 25 October 2000) is a Swiss professional footballer who plays as centre-forward for Swiss Super League club Basel.

Career
Born in Nyon, from a Swiss mother and a Senegalese father, he started playing football in Switzerland.

Lausanne-Sport
Ndoye started playing football in his local club FC La Côte Sports. Very quickly, he was spotted by Team Vaud (FC Lausanne-Sport's academy), where he started his adventure in the U13 category. Rising through the ranks at an impressive speed, he made his first steps with the U18s at the age of 15. He played 38 games and scored 23 goals in total for the U17 and U18s. Performances that allowed him to join Team Vaud U21, the reserve team of Lausanne-Sport, at the age of 17. Playing in the 4th Swiss division, he scored 7 goals in 21 games.

In the second half of the season 2018–19 season, he scored during his professional debut for Lausanne on 13 February 2019 against SC Kriens. In 15 matches, he scored 6 goals and quickly established himself as a key player.

Nice
On 27 January 2020 French Ligue 1 club OGC Nice confirmed that Ndoye had signed with the club, but would remain at Lausanne on loan for the rest of the 2019–20 season.

Basel
On 31 August 2021, Ndoye completed a move to Basel on a one-year-loan and joined Basel's first team during their 2021–22 season under head coach Patrick Rahmen. Ndoye played his domestic league debut for the club in the away game in the Cornaredo on 12 September as Basel played a 1–1 draw with Lugano. He scored his first goal for the team in the home game in the St. Jakob-Park on 30 September. This was the game in the group stage of the 2021–22 Europa Conference League as Basel won 4–2 against Kairat Almaty. Ndoye scored his first league goal for his new club on 30 October in the away game in the Letzigrund as Basel played a 3–3 draw against Zürich.

On 4 February 2022, Basel exercised the purchase option in their loan contract and signed Ndoye on a perminant basis with a four and a half year contract until the summer of 2026.

International career
Ndoye made his debut for the Switzerland national football team on 24 September 2022 in a Nations League game against Spain.

References

External links
 
 

2000 births
Living people
People from Nyon
Swiss people of Senegalese descent
Swiss men's footballers
Association football forwards
Switzerland under-21 international footballers
Switzerland youth international footballers
Switzerland international footballers
FC Lausanne-Sport players
OGC Nice players
FC Basel players
Ligue 1 players
Swiss Challenge League players
Swiss expatriate footballers
Swiss expatriate sportspeople in France
Expatriate footballers in France
Sportspeople from the canton of Vaud